Manuel Santana defeated Dennis Ralston in the final, 6–4, 11–9, 6–4 to win the gentlemen's singles tennis title at the 1966 Wimbledon Championships. Roy Emerson was the defending champion, but lost in the quarterfinals to Owen Davidson.

Seeds

  Roy Emerson (quarterfinals)
  Tony Roche (quarterfinals)
  Fred Stolle (second round)
  Manuel Santana (champion)
  John Newcombe (third round)
  Dennis Ralston (final)
  Cliff Drysdale (semifinals)
  Clark Graebner (second round)

Draw

Finals

Top half

Section 1

Section 2

Section 3

Section 4

Bottom half

Section 5

Section 6

Section 7

Section 8

References

External links

Men's Singles
Wimbledon Championship by year – Men's singles